Ivandro Cunha Lima (26 May 1930 – 28 May 2022) was a Brazilian politician who served as a Senator.

References

1930 births
2022 deaths
20th-century Brazilian lawyers
Brazilian Democratic Movement politicians
Members of the Federal Senate (Brazil)
People from João Pessoa, Paraíba